Willie Mitchell is the name of:
Willie Mitchell (American football) (born 1940), American former National Football League player
Willie Mitchell (baseball) (1889–1973), American Major League Baseball player
Willie Mitchell (basketball) (born 1975), American basketball player, former Mr. Basketball of Michigan
Willie Mitchell (ice hockey) (born 1977), Canadian National Hockey League player
Willie Mitchell (musician), (1928–2010), American musician and record producer

See also 
 William Mitchell (disambiguation)